is a small airport in the city of Iki on Iki Island in Nagasaki Prefecture, Japan.

History
Iki Airport was opened on July 10, 1964. Initially, the airport was served by All Nippon Airways with flights to Fukuoka; however, with the introduction of high speed jetfoil services between Fukuoka and Iki, flights to Fukuoka were discontinued from 2005. Flights to Tsushima, which were begun in 1980 by Oriental Air Bridge were discontinued in 1986. At present, the airport is connected only to Nagasaki with two flights per day.

Airlines and destinations

References

External links

 

Airports in Japan
Transport in Nagasaki Prefecture
Buildings and structures in Nagasaki Prefecture